Ernst-August Roth (19 April 1898 – 26 September 1975) was a highly decorated Generalleutnant in the Luftwaffe during World War II.  He was also a recipient of the Knight's Cross of the Iron Cross.  The Knight's Cross of the Iron Cross was awarded to recognise extreme battlefield bravery or successful military leadership.  Ernst-August Roth was captured by British troops in June 1945 and was held until March 1948.

Awards and decorations
 Erinnerungsabzeichen für Marine-Flugzeugführer und -Beobachter
 Iron Cross (1914)
 2nd Class
 Cross of Honor
 Iron Cross (1939)
 2nd Class
 1st Class
 German Cross in Gold on 13 November 1941 as Oberst in Kampfgeschwader 28
 Knight's Cross of the Iron Cross on 6 November 1943 as Generalmajor and Fliegerführer Nord

References

Citations

Bibliography

External links
TracesOfWar.com

Special Camp 11

1898 births
1975 deaths
People from the Province of Brandenburg
Recipients of the clasp to the Iron Cross, 2nd class
Recipients of the Gold German Cross
Recipients of the Knight's Cross of the Iron Cross
German prisoners of war in World War II held by the United Kingdom
Imperial German Navy personnel of World War I
German World War I pilots
Reichsmarine personnel
Luftwaffe World War II generals
Lieutenant generals of the Luftwaffe
Military personnel from Potsdam